Speedtrap is 1977 police chase action film starring Joe Don Baker and Tyne Daly.

Plot
After a wave of unsolved car thefts, an insurance company calls in private investigator Pete Novick (Joe Don Baker) to solve the case. While the chief of police isn't thrilled about having an outsider come and show up his men, one of the officers is a former girlfriend of Novick's who's more than willing to help him out in any way she can. After a long and convoluted investigation with false leads, psychics and the mafia, Novick at last unravels the identity of the thief.

Cast
 Joe Don Baker as Pete Novick
 Tyne Daly as Nifty Nolan
 Richard Jaeckel as Billy
 Robert Loggia as Spillano
 Lana Wood as Blossom
 Morgan Woodward as Hogan
 Timothy Carey as Loomis

External links
 "Speedtrap" at IMDB

1977 films
1970s action thriller films
1970s road movies
American action thriller films
American road movies
1970s chase films
Films directed by Earl Bellamy
American chase films
Films about automobiles
1970s English-language films
1970s American films